John IV Sarugoyo was the Maphrian of the East of the Syriac Orthodox Church, from 1164 until his death in 1189.

Biography
From 1180 to 1204, the church suffered from division as Theodore Bar Wahbun, Karim Bar Masih, and their supporters attempted to usurp the patriarchal office from the patriarch Michael I Rabo. Having been forced to flee Mardin, Theodore and Karim travelled to the Monastery of Mar Mattai near Mosul to attempt to convince John to support his claim to the patriarchal office, but he refused.

Theodore and Karim travelled throughout Upper Mesopotamia as they attempted to gather supporters and later arranged to meet with dignitaries of Michael I Rabo in Dara. Upon learning that the usurpers were in Dara, John and several bishops travelled there, captured, and brought them before the patriarch in the Monastery of Mar Barsoum near Melitene. They later escaped the monastery and continued to disrupt the church beyond John's death in 1189 and Karim later had himself ordained as maphrian without the authorisation of Michael I, and assumed the name Dionysius.

Bibliography

12th-century Syriac Orthodox Church bishops
Maphrians
Syrian archbishops
1188 deaths
12th-century Oriental Orthodox archbishops